The 2019 Louisville Cardinals baseball team represents the University of Louisville during the 2019 NCAA Division I baseball season. The Cardinals play their home games at Jim Patterson Stadium as a member of the Atlantic Coast Conference. They are led by head coach Dan McDonnell, in his thirteenth year at Louisville.

Roster

Schedule

{| class="toccolours" width=95% style="clear:both; margin:1.5em auto; text-align:center;"
|-
! colspan=2 style=""| 2019 Louisville Cardinals Baseball Game Log
|-
! colspan=2 style=""| Regular Season
|- valign="top" 
|

|- 
|

|- 
|

|- 
|

|-
! colspan=2 style=""| Postseason (8–5)
|- 
|

|- 
|

|- 
|

|- 
|

"#" represents ranking. All rankings from Collegiate Baseball on the date of the contest.
"()" represents postseason seeding in the ACC Tournament or NCAA Regional, respectively.

References

Louisville Cardinals
Louisville Cardinals baseball seasons
Louisville Cardinals baseball
Louisville Cardinals
College World Series seasons